This is the results breakdown of the local elections held in Aragon on 26 May 2019. The following tables show detailed results in the autonomous community's most populous municipalities, sorted alphabetically.

Opinion polls

City control
The following table lists party control in the most populous municipalities, including provincial capitals (shown in bold). Gains for a party are displayed with the cell's background shaded in that party's colour.

Municipalities

Calatayud
Population: 20,035

Huesca
Population: 52,463

Teruel
Population: 35,691

Zaragoza

Population: 666,880

See also
2019 Aragonese regional election

References

Aragon
2019